The Abadan Crisis was a major event in Iranian history. It began in 1951 with the nationalization of the Anglo-Iranian Oil Company by the government of Iran, and the shutting down by the British of the Anglo-Iranian Oil Company's huge oil refinery in Abadan. It ended with a successful CIA-orchestrated coup which overthrew the democratically elected government of Mohammed Mosaddeq in 1953, and enabled the Shah to rule autocratically for the next 26 years, before he was overthrown by the Iranian Revolution.

Background

Mosaddeq becomes prime minister

Mosaddeq resigns, is reinstated and wins emergency powers

Opposition grows

Referendum

Coup

See also
 Abadan Crisis
 International crisis
 National Front of Iran
 Mohammed Mossadeq
 1953 Iranian coup d'état

References

History of the foreign relations of the United States
Iran–United States relations
Iran–United Kingdom relations
20th century in Iran
Abadan, Iran
Iranian timelines
1950s in Iran
Anglo-Persian Oil Company